Borsay is a Hungarian surname, meaning "Of the town of Borsa". Notable people with the surname include:

 Kait Borsay (born 1978), British television voiceover artist presenter
 Peter Borsay, professor of history at Aberystwyth University

Hungarian-language surnames
Toponymic surnames